Javier Marcelo Correa (born 23 October 1992) is an Argentine professional footballer who plays as a forward for Liga MX club Santos Laguna.

Career statistics

Club

References

1992 births
Living people
Footballers from Córdoba, Argentina
Argentine footballers
Association football forwards
Argentine expatriate footballers
Primera Nacional players
Paraguayan Primera División players
Argentine Primera División players
Liga MX players
Instituto footballers
General Paz Juniors footballers
Ferro Carril Oeste footballers
Club Olimpia footballers
Rosario Central footballers
Godoy Cruz Antonio Tomba footballers
Club Atlético Colón footballers
Santos Laguna footballers
Atlas F.C. footballers
Racing Club de Avellaneda footballers
Expatriate footballers in Paraguay
Expatriate footballers in Mexico
Argentine expatriate sportspeople in Paraguay
Argentine expatriate sportspeople in Mexico